Bryan Cooper (born 22 December 1931) is an English former professional rugby league footballer who played in the 1940s, 1950s and 1960s. He played at club level for Hull F.C. (Heritage No.), usually as a right-, i.e. number 3. He was one-club man who represented his home town club throughout the 1950s.

Background
Cooper was born in Kingston upon Hull, East Riding of Yorkshire, England, and he worked as a joiner.

Playing career

Championship final appearances
Cooper played right-, i.e. number 3, in Hull FC's 10–9 victory over Halifax in the Championship Final during the 1955–56 season at Maine Road, Manchester on Saturday 12 May 1956, in front of a crowd of 36,675, he did not play in the 14–15 defeat by Oldham in the Championship Final during the 1956–57 season at Odsal Stadium, Bradford on Saturday 16 May 1957, in front of a crowd of 62,233, and he played right-, i.e. number 3, and scored a try in the 20–3 victory over Workington Town in Championship Final during the 1957–58 season at Odsal Stadium, Bradford on Saturday 17 May 1958, in front of a crowd of 57,699.

Challenge Cup Final appearances
Cooper played right-, i.e. number 3, in Hull FC's 13–30 defeat by Wigan in the 1958–59 Challenge Cup Final during the 1958–59 season at Wembley Stadium, London, in front of a crowd of 79,811.

Yorkshire Cup Final appearances
Cooper did not play for Hull F.C. in the 10–10 draw with Halifax in the 1955–56 Yorkshire County Cup Final during the 1955–56 season at Headingley Rugby Stadium, Leeds on Saturday 22 October 1955, in front of a crowd of 23,520, and the 0–7 defeat by Halifax in the 1955–56 Yorkshire County Cup Final during the 1955–56 season at Odsal Stadium, Bradford on Wednesday 2 November 1955, in front of a crowd of 14,000.

References

External links

Search for "Cooper" at rugbyleagueproject.org
 (archived by web.archive.org) Stats → PastPlayers → C at hullfc.com
 (archived by web.archive.org) Statistics at hullfc.com
Search for "Brian Cooper" at britishnewspaperarchive.co.uk
Search for "Bryan Cooper" at britishnewspaperarchive.co.uk

1931 births
Living people
English rugby league players
Hull F.C. players
Rugby articles needing expert attention
Rugby league centres